CFS Resolution Island (BAF-5) is a short-range radar site. It is part of the North Warning System. During the Cold War, it was operated as part of the Pinetree Line network controlled by NORAD.

History
As a result of the Cold War and with the expansion of a North American continental air defense system, Resolution Island was selected as a site for a United States Air Force (USAF) radar station, one of the many that would make up the Pinetree Line of Ground-Control Intercept (GCI) radar sites.

The United States Air Force Northeast Air Command (NEAC) established a general surveillance radar station on Resolution Island in 1953, designating the site as "Resolution Island Air Station", with Site-ID of N-30.  The 920th Aircraft Control and Warning Squadron was assigned to the site on 19 January 1952.  It was equipped with the following radars:
 Search Radars: AN/FPS-3C, AN/FPS-502
 Height Radars: AN/TPS-502

As a GCI base, the 920th's role was to guide interceptor aircraft toward unidentified intruders picked up on the unit's radar scopes. These interceptors were assigned to the 64th Air Division at Goose AFB, Labrador.  In 1957, with the inactivation of NEAC, the station came under the jurisdiction of Air Defense Command.

Routine operations from the station were performed until 1 November 1961, when the station was inactivated and turned over to the Royal Canadian Air Force, which closed the facility.

The Canadian Coast Guard operated a radio station from 1929(?) until 1975 under the call sign VAW. The station (MF Marine) was then moved to Killinek (NWT/Nunavut), on the south shore of the Hudson Strait.

 1918 Cape Sable Direction finding (DF) station opens

 1929 Resolution Island Radio opens

 US Navy Radio Navigational Aids 1943 lists this as a DF stn at Resolution Island, also broadcasting navigational warnings on 500 kHz.

The site was re-activated by the Canadian Forces as an unmanned North Warning System, short range radar site in 1991.

See also
 Resolution Island (Nunavut)
 List of Royal Canadian Air Force stations
 List of USAF Aerospace Defense Command General Surveillance Radar Stations

References

 Cornett, Lloyd H. and Johnson, Mildred W., A Handbook of Aerospace Defense Organization  1946 - 1980,  Office of History, Aerospace Defense Center, Peterson AFB, CO (1980).
 Winkler, David F. & Webster, Julie L., Searching the Skies, The Legacy of the United States Cold War Defense Radar Program,  US Army Construction Engineering Research Laboratories, Champaign, IL (1997).
 Information for Resolution Island AS, NT

External links
Resolution Island, Nunavut BAF-5 / RES-X
 Air Force magazine article on Resolution Island AFS, December 2011

Resolution Island
Radar stations of the United States Air Force
Aerospace Defense Command military installations
Installations of the United States Air Force in Canada
1953 establishments in the Northwest Territories
1961 disestablishments in the Northwest Territories
Military installations established in 1953
Military installations closed in 1961